Matthew Parker (born 25 January 1996) is an Australian rules footballer who played for the Richmond Football Club and St Kilda Football Club in the Australian Football League (AFL). He played 30 matches over 4 seasons in his AFL career.

AFL career

St Kilda (2019–2020)
Drafted to the Saints at the mature age of 22. Parker was recruited from South Fremantle in the WAFL where he had played 27 senior games and kicked 39 goals at the two years he spent at the club. Parker had only previously played in the amateur league.

Drafted to the Saints with pick 47 in the 2018 AFL draft.

Parker played 17 games in his debut season but managed only 2 in his final season. His was delisted at the end of 2020.

Return to state-league (2021)
After being delisted by St Kilda, Parker returned to his former WAFL club South Fremantle.He was selected to represent Western Australia in the interstate match against South Australia in 2021.

Richmond (2021–2022)
In the 2021 AFL Mid-Season Rookie Draft, Parker was selected by Richmond with the 10th pick. Parker played his first game with Richmond in round 18 against the Brisbane Lions.

On the 23rd of September, Parker committed to a new one-year deal to remain at Punt Road in 2022.

In 2022 Parker called time on his Richmond career and returned home to Western Australia for family reasons.

AFL statistics

|-
| 2019
|style="text-align:center;"|
| 34 || 17 || 16 || 13 || 119 || 61 || 180 || 50 || 51 || 0.9 || 0.8 || 7.0 || 3.6 || 10.6 || 2.9 || 3.0
|-
| 2020
|
| 34 || 2 || 0 || 2 || 8 || 5 || 13 || 1 || 5 || 0.0 || 1.0 || 4.0 || 2.5 || 6.5 || 0.5 || 2.5
|-
| 2021
|style="text-align:center;"|
| 37 || 6 || 3 || 3 || 47 || 32 || 79 || 18 || 29 || 0.5 || 0.5 || 7.8 || 5.3 || 13.2 || 3.0 || 4.8
|-
| 2022
|style="text-align:center;"|
| 37 || 5 || 4 || 3 || 40 || 19 || 59 || 22 || 9 || 0.8 || 0.6 || 8.0 || 3.8 || 11.8 || 4.4 || 1.8
|- class="sortbottom"
! colspan=3| Career
! 30
! 23
! 21
! 214
! 117
! 331
! 91
! 94
! 0.8
! 0.7
! 7.1
! 3.9
! 11.0
! 3.0
! 3.1
|}

Notes

References

External links 

1996 births
Living people
St Kilda Football Club players
South Fremantle Football Club players
Australian rules footballers from Western Australia
Indigenous Australian players of Australian rules football
Richmond Football Club players